Guenette is a settlement in Guadeloupe in the commune of Le Moule, on the island of Grande-Terre.  It is located to the east of Guillocheau and Laureal, and to the south of Conchou; Dubedou and Zevallos lie to its east, and Gardel and Renard to its south.

Populated places in Guadeloupe